The civil flag of Hesse consists of a bicolor of a red top and a bottom white stripe, in the proportion 3:5. The state flag is similar, except it is emblazoned with the state coat of arms in the centre, and may only be used by government departments and services.

The colours red and white are based on that of the Ludovingian coat of arms, showing a lion with a ninefold horizontal white and red division. The coat of arms was inherited by the House of Hesse upon its split from the 
Duchy of Thuringia in 1247, and the flag came into use in the early modern Landgraviate of Hesse; the modern Grand Duchy of Hesse used a flag with two red stripes, as did the People's State of Hesse until 1933.

The flag of Thuringia was introduced in 1920, with its formation out of the fragmented Thuringian states (the Duchy of Thuringia had been absorbed into Saxony in 1400), as the reverse of the flag of Hesse.

The civil flag of Hesse resembles that of Monaco's and, particularly, Indonesia's.

It also resembles one of the flags of Alsace.

The Hessian Ministry of the Interior designated several official flag days. On these days, the flag of Hesse (alongside with the Flag of the European Union and Germany) must be flown on all official buildings. These days include:

On the Commemoration Day for the Victims of National Socialism and on People's Mourning Day, flags are flown at half-mast. Additionally, flags must be flown on days to the election to the European Parliament, the Bundestag, the Hessian Landtag and municipal elections.

History

References

Flags of states of Germany
Flag
Red and white flags

de:Landeswappen Hessen